Shandong Jianzhu University, also translated as Shandong University of Architecture and Engineering, is a public university in Jinan, Shandong province, China. Founded in 1956 as the Jinan Construction and Engineering School, over time it evolved into a full university. Since 1998, it has the right to offer Master-degree studies. Since 2012, it has the right to offer Doctoral-degree.

Administration

Faculties 
School of Civil Engineering
Management Engineering
Thermal Energy Engineering
School of Municipal and Environmental Engineering
Building Planning Institute
Institute of Electrical and Mechanical Engineering
School of Materials Science and Engineering
College of Information and Electrical Engineering
Adult Education College
College of Arts
School of Business
School of Computer Science and Technology
College of Science
College of Law and Politics
College of Foreign Languages
Department of Physical Education

External links
 Shandong University of Architecture and Engineering website 
Shandong University of Architecture and Engineering Official Website 

Universities and colleges in Jinan